

The Aerodynos JA 177 Evolution is a Colombian two-seat ultralight monoplane produced by Aerodynos de Colombia to be sold complete or as a homebuilt.

Design and development
The design was started in 2003. The Evolution is a high-wing strut-braced monoplane with side-by-side seating for two. It is powered by a  Rotax 912 ULS flat-four piston engine with a three-bladed propeller. An economy variant (the JA 177 Pingouin) is being sold in France for the European market.

Variants
Evolution I
Original variant
Evolution II
Improved variant
Pingouin
Economy variant

Specifications (Levitation II with Rotax 912)

References

Notes

Bibliography

External links

Homebuilt aircraft
2000s Colombian civil utility aircraft